The Bolshoi Ballet is an internationally renowned classical ballet company based at the Bolshoi Theatre in Moscow, Russia. Founded in 1776, the Bolshoi is among the world's oldest ballet companies. In the early 20th century, it came to international prominence as Moscow became the capital of Soviet Russia. The Bolshoi has been recognised as one of the foremost ballet companies in the world. It has a branch at the Bolshoi Ballet Theater School in Joinville, Brazil.

History

The earliest iteration of the Bolshoi Ballet can be found in the creation of a dance school for a Moscow orphanage in 1773. In 1776, dancers from the school were employed by Prince Pyotr Vasilyevich Urusov and English theatrical entrepreneur Michael Maddox to form part of their new theatre company. Originally performing in privately owned venues, they later acquired the Petrovsky Theatre, which, as a result of fires and erratic redevelopment, would later be rebuilt as today's Bolshoi Theatre. While some guest dancers come and go from other prestigious ballet companies, such as Mariinsky and American Ballet Theatre, most company dancers are graduates of the academy. In 1989, Michael Shannon was the first American ballet dancer to graduate from the Bolshoi Ballet Academy and join the Bolshoi Ballet company.

Despite staging many famous ballets, it struggled to compete with the reputation of the Imperial Russian Ballet, today's Mariinsky Ballet of St. Petersburg. It was not until the appointment of Alexander Gorsky as Ballet Master in 1900 that the company began to develop its own unique identity, with acclaimed productions of new or restaged ballets including Don Quixote (1900), Coppélia (1901), Swan Lake (1901), La fille mal gardée (1903), Giselle (1911), Le Corsaire (1912) and La Bayadère (1917).

The Soviet leadership's preference for uncomplicated moral themes in the arts was demonstrated in Yuri Grigorovich's appointment as director in 1964. Grigorovich held his position until 1995, at which point a series of directors, including Boris Akimov, Alexei Ratmansky, Yuri Burlaka and Sergei Filin, brought more modern dance performance ideas to the company.

Repertoire

 A Hero of Our Time, Yuri Possokhov
 A Legend of Love, Yuri Grigorovich
 Anna Karenina, John Neumeier
 Anyuta, Vladimir Vasiliev
 Apollo, George Balanchine
 Carmen Suite, Alberto Alonso
 Coppélia, Marius Petipa and Enrico Cecchetti; Revived by Sergei Vikharev
 Don Quixote, Marius Petipa and Alexander Gorsky; Revived by Alexei Fadeyechev
 Études, Harald Lander
 Forgotten Land
 Frank Bridge Variations, Hans van Manen
 Giselle, Jean Coralli and Jules Perrot; Version of Yuri Grigorovich
 Ivan the Terrible, Yuri Grigorovich
 Jewels, George Balanchine
 La Bayadere, Marius Petipa; Version of Yuri Grigorovich
 La Fille du pharaon, Pierre Lacotte
 La Fille mal gardée, Alexander Gorsky; Version of Yuri Grigorovich
 La Sylphide, August Bournonville; Version of Johan Kobborg
 Lady of the Camellias (La Dame aux camelias), John Neumeier
 Le Corsaire, Marius Petipa; Version of Alexei Ratmansky and Yuri Burlaka
 Nureyev
 The Nutcracker, Yuri Grigorovich
 Ondine, Vyacheslav Samodurov
 Onegin, John Cranko
 Raymonda', Marius Petipa; Version of Yuri Grigorovich
 Romeo and Juliet, Yuri Grigorovich
 Romeo and Juliet, Alexei Ratmansky
 Russian Seasons, Alexei Ratmansky
 Short Time Together, Paul Lightfoot and Sol Leon
 Spartacus, Yuri Grigorovich
 Swan Lake', Marius Petipa; Version of Yuri Grigorovich
 Symphony of Psalms, Jiri Kylian
 The Bright Stream, Alexei Ratmansky
 The Cage', Jerome Robbins
 The Flames of Paris, Vasily Vainonen, Version of Alexei Ratmansky
 The Golden Age, Yuri Grigorovich
 The Sleeping Beauty, Marius Petipa; Version of Yuri Grigorovich
 Taming of the Shrew, Jean-Christophe Maillot

Notable staff

Dancers

Galina Ulanova
Marina Semyonova
Olga Lepeshinskaya
Mikhail Mordkin
Vasily Tikhomirov
Yekaterina Geltzer
Asaf Messerer
Maya Plisetskaya
Pyotr Gusev
Aleksey Yermolayev
Nikolai Fadeyechev
Maris Liepa
Ekaterina Maximova
Vladimir Vasiliev
Natalia Bessmertnova
Ludmila Semenyaka
Nadezhda Pavlova
Joy Womack
Svetlana Adyrkhaeva 

Nina Timofeeva 

Irek Mukhamedov
Alexander Godunov

Nina Ananiashvili
Dmitry Belogolovtsev
Natalia Osipova
Svetlana Lunkina
Dmitry Gudanov
Anna Antonicheva

Directors
Alexander Gorsky
Vasily Tikhomirov
Vladimir Urin

Conductors

Yuri Fayer
Algis Shuraitis

Choreographers
Rostislav Zakharov
Leonid Lavrovsky
Fyodor Lopukhov
Yury Grigorovich

Composers
Dimitri Shostakovich
Aram Khachaturian

Company structure
Today the Bolshoi Ballet remains one of the world's foremost ballet companies, in addition to being one of the largest, with approximately 220 dancers. The word "bolshoi" means "big" or "grand" in Russian. The company operates on a hierarchical system, similar to those used by other leading European ballet companies, with senior dancers ranked as principals, and descending in order of importance through lead soloist, first soloist, soloist and finally, corps de ballet. Due to its size, the company operates two troupes of corps de ballet.

In 2000, the Bolshoi Ballet opened its first Ballet Academy outside Russia, in Joinville, Brazil.

Performance style
The performance style of the Bolshoi Ballet is typically identified as being colourful and bold, combining technique and athleticism with expressiveness and dramatic intensity. This style is commonly attributed to Alexander Gorsky. Historically there has been a fierce rivalry with the St. Petersburg Heritage Ballet Company, the Mariinsky. Both have developed very different performing styles: the Bolshoi has a more colourful and bold approach, whereas the Mariinsky is associated with more pure and refined classicism.

Dancers
Principal dancers
Source:FemaleMaria Alexandrova (working under contract)
Maria Allash (working under contract)
Nina Kaptsova (working under contract)
Alena Kovaleva
Ekaterina Krysanova 
Anna Nikulina
Evgenia Obraztsova

Yekaterina Shipulina (working under contract)
Anastasia Stashkevich
Yulia Stepanova
Svetlana ZakharovaMaleSemyon Chudin
Egor Gerashchenko
Vladislav Lantratov
Mikhail Lobukhin
Vyacheslav Lopatin
Artem Ovcharenko

Ruslan Skvortsov (working under contract)
Alexander Volchkov (working under contract)

Leading soloistsFemaleAnastasia Goryacheva
Kristina Kretova
Olga Marchenkova
Eleonora Sevenard
Maria VinogradovaMaleFirst soloistsFemaleDaria Khokhlova
Elizaveta Kokoreva 
Anastasia Meskova
Eva Sergeyenkova 
Margarita Shrayner
Anna TikhomirovaMaleVitaly Biktimirov
Alexander Vodopetov
Denis Zakharov

SoloistsFemaleAnastasia Chapkina
Anastasia Denisova
Yulia Grebenshchikova
Kristina Karasyova
Olga Kishnyova

Elizaveta Kruteleva
Yulia Skvortsova

Anastasia Vinokur
Angelina Vlashnets
Viktoria Yakusheva
Ksenia ZhiganshinaMale'''

Karim Abdullin
Klim Efimov 
Alexander Fadeyechev
Georgy Gusev
Egor Khromushin
Anton Savichev
Alexander Smoliyaninov

Corps de ballet
The Bolshoi Ballet operates two troupes of corps de ballet, with approximately 169 dancers in total.

Controversies
In 2013, ballerina Anastasia Volochkova claimed that female dancers were forced to sleep with wealthy patrons, saying: "It mainly happened with the corps du [sic] ballet but also with the soloists. [...] I repeatedly received such propositions to share the beds of oligarchs."  American dancer Joy Womack echoed this concern when she left the company after being told that, to secure solo roles, she must either pay $10,000 or "start a relationship with a sponsor."

In January 2013, a sulfuric acid attack on art director Sergei Filin once again steeped the company in scandal. Bolshoi dancer Pavel Dmitrichenko was convicted of organizing the attack and was sentenced to six years in prison. Reasons for the attack include corruption within the company.

In 2014, 25-year-old ballet dancer Olga Demina mysteriously went missing. In September 2020, Russian investigators announced that they believe Demina may have been killed in a blackmail plot by Malkhaz Dzhavoev, whom she was dating and was allegedly her "manager."

In July 2017, the Bolshoi Theatre cancelled the premiere of a ballet about openly gay Soviet dancer Rudolf Nureyev. The Director General claimed that it was due to poor dancing quality; however, principal dancer Maria Alexandrova claimed it was the first sign of a 'new era' of censorship. It was the first time a show has been pulled in such a way since the collapse of the Soviet Union, sparking rumours about the motivation behind the move.

See also
List of productions of Swan Lake derived from its 1895 revival
Moscow State Academy of Choreography, affiliate school

References

External links
  
  

 
Ballet companies in Russia
National Dance Award winners
History of ballet